Takthok Monastery (also known as Thag Thog or Thak Thak) is a Buddhist monastery in Sakti village in Ladakh, northern India, located approximately 46 kilometres east of Leh. It is the only monastery in Ladakh belonging to the Nying-ma-pa or Red Hat sect. The name Takthok, literally meaning 'rock-roof' was named because both its roof as well as walls are made up of rock. It belongs to the Nyingma tradition of Tibetan Buddhism and approximately 55 lamas reside there. It is the only Nyingma monastery in Ladakh.

The monastery was founded around the mid-16th century during the reign of Tsewang Namgyal I (1575-1595) on a mountainside around a cave in which Padmasambhava is said to have meditated in the 8th century.

Description
The main temple is very dark and gloomy with a low ceiling of rock completely covered with the residue from centuries of butterlamps having been burned there. The paintings that once adorned the walls are covered with grime and even the floor feels sticky. Further down another cave has been turned into a kitchen which has immense stoves capable of producing enough food for all the pilgrims who arrive for the annual festival (which has been shifted to the summer months to accommodate tourists). The Assembly Hall, or du-khang'''s verandah, has paintings of the Four Lords, while the walls have recent paintings of fierce protector divinities, some of which adorn the verandah entrance. The du-khang also contains statues of Maitreya, Padmasambhava and his manifestation Dorje Takposal.

A new temple was consecrated by the 14th Dalai Lama in 1980 just below the main gompa complex. A small cave behind them is believed to be the place where Padmasambhava lived and meditated for three years. The monastery also has the 108 volumes of the Kanjur of Buddha's teachings.

Gallery

Footnotes

References
Rizvi, Janet (1996). Ladakh: Crossroads of High Asia''. 1st edition 1983. 2nd revised edition 1996. Oxford University Press, New Delhi. .

Buddhist monasteries in Ladakh
Nyingma monasteries and temples